Alvin Glenn Davis (born September 9, 1960), nicknamed "Mr. Mariner", is a former Major League Baseball first baseman and designated hitter. He played eight of his nine seasons for the Seattle Mariners and won the American League Rookie of the Year Award in 1984.

Early years
The youngest of four sons, Davis was born and raised in Riverside, California. His father died in 1970, and Davis graduated from John W. North High School in 1978. He was selected in the 1978 Major League Baseball draft by the San Francisco Giants, but opted to play college baseball at Arizona State in Tempe. Davis, who batted left-handed and threw right-handed, was later drafted by the Oakland Athletics in sixth round in 1981, but opted to stay in college and earned a degree in finance.

Minor league career
After his senior season at ASU in 1982, Davis was drafted in June by the Seattle Mariners in the sixth round (138th overall) and played the rest of the season in Double-A, in Massachusetts for the Lynn Sailors in the Eastern League. Davis continued at that level in 1983 in Tennessee, with the Chattanooga Lookouts in the Southern League. He hit .296 with 18 home runs and nearly averaged a walk per game.

Davis began the 1984 season in Triple-A, with the Salt Lake City Gulls of the Pacific Coast League. After just one game, he was promoted to the majors, due to a hand injury to Ken Phelps on April 6, and Davis remained with Seattle for eight seasons, through 1991. In that only game for Salt Lake, he went two-for-three with a walk, and never returned to the minors.

Major league career

Seattle Mariners
During a nine-year major league career, Davis batted .280 with 160 home runs and 683 runs batted in. He hit 20-plus homers in three seasons, and drove in over 100 runs twice.

Davis holds the Mariners and Major League Baseball record for the most consecutive games reaching base to start a career, with 47. Well-liked by Mariners fans, Davis held most of the young franchise's offensive records until the arrival of Ken Griffey Jr., Edgar Martínez, and Alex Rodriguez. His fellow players thought highly of him as well. "You know sooner or later we're going to score some runs," teammate Ed Vande Berg said in 1984. "We have mister everything on the offense – Mr. Alvin Davis." Tommy John called him a "modern-day George Scott," explaining, "When Scott first came into the league, no one knew how to pitch to him, and they didn't find out for three years."

Davis made his major league debut in Boston's Fenway Park on April 11, 1984; he homered in his first two big league  and collected two doubles in his sixth and three doubles in the next. After his first week, Davis had a .370 batting average, a .778 slugging percentage, and a seven-game hitting streak. He reached base in each of the first 47 games of his career, and was chosen for his only All-Star Game as a rookie. Named the Mariners' MVP, he was also voted the American League's Rookie of the Year, with a .284 batting average, 27 home runs, and 116 RBIs. Davis hit a career-high 29 home runs in 1987, and he had perhaps his best season in 1989, when he finished second in the American League with a .920 OPS. Davis was inducted into the Seattle Mariners Hall of Fame in 1997.

With the addition of Pete O'Brien in 1990, Davis was increasingly used as Seattle's designated hitter. He only saw action on defense as a first baseman in 52 games that season, further reduced to just 14 games in 1991. His batting average fell to .221 in 1991 with 12 home runs; with young Tino Martinez in the organization, Davis was not in the team's plans for 1992.

Davis' season high for home runs was 29 in 1987 and his most RBI (116) came as a rookie in 1984. His highest batting average for a season was .305 in 1989.

California Angels
After eight years in Seattle, Davis was a free agent and signed with the California Angels in February 1992. In 40 games with the Angels in a platoon role, he hit .250 with no homers and 16 runs driven in. Davis had two hits in his final major league game, but was released after only a half season in late June.  joined the Kintetsu Buffaloes of Osaka in Japan, and appeared in 40 games in the Pacific League, with five home runs with 12 RBIs.

Personal life
Davis lives in his hometown of Riverside with his wife Kim; they have three children. Alvin has been a volunteer at Cornerstone Fellowship Bible Church for the past nine years overseeing the church's finances and has served as a member of the church's elder board for over 20 years.
He has also previously coached baseball at Martin Luther King High School for ten years.
After his father's death in 1970, Davis and his mother Mylie had a very close relationship, and she relocated from Riverside to Tempe when he was in college.

In 1997, Davis was inducted into the Seattle Mariners Hall of Fame.

In 2012, Davis returned to the Seattle Mariners organization as a roving minor league instructor.

References

External links

Venezuelan Professional League statistics

Major League Baseball first basemen
Major League Baseball designated hitters
California Angels players
Seattle Mariners players
American League All-Stars
Baseball players from Riverside, California
African-American baseball players
Major League Baseball Rookie of the Year Award winners
American expatriate baseball players in Japan
Kintetsu Buffaloes players
Arizona State Sun Devils baseball players
Lynn Sailors players
Salt Lake City Gulls players
Chattanooga Lookouts players
Leones del Caracas players
American expatriate baseball players in Venezuela
1960 births
Living people
21st-century African-American people
20th-century African-American sportspeople
Alaska Goldpanners of Fairbanks players